Xaver Bayer (born 5 May 1977 in Vienna) is an Austrian writer.

Life 
He studied philosophy and German.

In 2000 he founded the Internet platform dieflut.at, one of the first digital literature collectives. In addition to his novels, stories and plays, he has written texts for collaborative works with the painters Martha Jungwirth and David Schnell and the art collective G.R.A.M. He also co-wrote the screenplay for the film Glanz des Tages ("Shine of the Day") by Rainer Frimmel and Tizza Covi, which won the Max Ophüls Prize.

Awards 
 2002 Hermann-Lenz-Stipendium
 2004 Reinhard-Priessnitz-Preis
 2008 Hermann-Lenz-Preis
 2011 Österreichischer Förderungspreis der Stadt Wien
 2014 Literar-Mechana-Stipendium
 2019: Niederösterreichischer Culture Price in litterature
 2020 Österreichischer Buchpreis for Geschichten mit Marianne

Works 
 Heute könnte ein glücklicher Tag sein (novel, 2001) Jung und Jung, Salzburg (TB 2003 )
 Die Alaskastraße (novel, 2003) Jung und Jung, Salzburg (TB 2005 )
 Als ich heute aufwachte, aufstand und mich wusch, da schien mir plötzlich, mir sei alles klar auf dieser Welt und ich wüsste, wie man leben soll (play, 2004) 
 Weiter (novel, 2006) 
 Das Buch vom Regen und Schnee (prose, 2007, with lithographies by Martha Jungwirth) 
 Die durchsichtigen Hände (short stories, 2008) 
 Wenn die Kinder Steine ins Wasser werfen (prose, 2011) 
 Aus dem Nebenzimmer (prose and poetry, 2014) 
 Geheimnisvolles Knistern aus dem Zauberreich (prose, 2014) Jung und Jung, Salzburg 
 Atlas (short story, 2017) 
 Wildpark (prose, 2018) 
 Geschichten mit Marianne (short stories, 2020), Jung und Jung, Salzburg 2020  , translated in French La Vie avec Marianne, Éditions du Faubourg 2022

Literature 
 Martin Brinkmann: Unbehagliche Welten. Wirklichkeitserfahrungen in der neuen deutschsprachigen Literatur, dargestellt anhand von Christian Krachts „Faserland“ (1995), Elke Naters „Königinnen“ (1998), Xaver Bayers „Heute könnte ein glücklicher Tag sein“ (2001) und Wolfgang Schömels „Die Schnecke. Überwiegend neurotische Geschichten“ (2002). In: Weimarer Beiträge 53 (2007), H. 1, S. 17–46

References

External links 
 
 Videolesung „Die durchsichtigen Hände“ auf zehnseiten.de
 Interview auf ZEIT-online

1977 births
21st-century Austrian writers
German-language writers
21st-century Austrian novelists
Writers from Vienna
Austrian male writers
Living people
21st-century male writers